The 1995 Gael Linn Cup, the most important representative competition for elite level participants in the women's team field sport of camogie, was won by Munster, who defeated Connacht in the final, played at Russell Park, Blanchardstown Co Dublin.

Arrangements
Holders Munster defeated Ulster 3–14 to 2–10 at Russell Park. Connacht defeated Leinster 6–10 to 1–10. Munster won the final 4–13 to 3–10.
In the Gael Linn Trophy semi-finals, Connacht defeated Leinster and Munster defeated Ulster 3–10 to 1–4. Mairéad Coyle scored the decisive goal in the Gael Linn trophy final to give Connacht a 1–9 to 0–10 victory over Munster.

Final stages

|}

Junior Final

|}

References

External links
 Camogie Association

1995 in camogie
1995